The following Union Army units and commanders fought in the Battle of the Crater (July 30, 1864) of the American Civil War. The Confederate order of battle is listed separately.

Abbreviations used

Military Rank
 LTG = Lieutenant General
 MG = Major General
 BG = Brigadier General
 Col = Colonel
 Ltc = Lieutenant Colonel
 Maj = Major
 Cpt = Captain
 Lt = Lieutenant

Other
 w = wounded
 mw = mortally wounded
 k = killed in action
 c = captured

Union Forces

General in Chief

LTG Ulysses S. Grant, commander in chief

Army of the Potomac

MG George Meade

Provost Guard:

BG Marsena R. Patrick
 1st Indiana Cavalry, Company K: Cpt Theodore Majtheny
 1st Massachusetts Cavalry, Companies C & D: Cpt Charles Francis Adams, Jr.
 80th New York: Col Theodore B. Gates
 3rd Pennsylvania Cavalry, Companies A, B, & M: Maj James W. Walsh
 68th Pennsylvania: Col Andrew H. Tippin
 114th Pennsylvania: Col Charles H. T. Collis

Engineer Brigade:

BG Henry W. Benham
 15th New York Engineers (5 companies): Maj William A. Ketchum
 50th New York Engineers:
 Battalion U.S. Engineers: Cpt George H. Mendell

Signal Corps: Cpt Benjamin F. Fisher

Guards and Orderlies:

 Independent Company Oneida Cavalry (New York): Cpt Daniel P. Mann

IX Corps

MG Ambrose Burnside

Provost Guard:
 8th United States: Cpt Milton Cogswell

Army of the James

MG Benjamin F. Butler

Siege Artillery: Col Henry L. Abbot
 1st Connecticut Heavy Artillery: Col Henry Larcom Abbot
 Company A: Cpt Edward A. Gillet
 Company B: Cpt Albert F. Booker
 Company M: Cpt Franklin A. Pratt

XVIII Corps

MG Edward Ord

X Corps

(attached to XVIII Corps)

See also

 Virginia in the American Civil War
 Petersburg National Battlefield

Notes

References
 
 Kinard, Jeff.  The Battle of the Crater (Abilene, TX:  McWhiney Foundation Press), 1998. 

American Civil War orders of battle